Urban Hettich (born 2 March 1953 in Schonach im Schwarzwald) is a West German Nordic combined competitor and cross-country skier who was active during the 1970s. His best-known finish was a silver at the 1976 Winter Olympics in Innsbruck in the Individual event.

Hettich also finished seventh in the men's 4 x 10 km relay at the 1972 Winter Olympics in Sapporo.

External links
 
 

German male Nordic combined skiers
German male cross-country skiers
Olympic silver medalists for West Germany
Cross-country skiers at the 1972 Winter Olympics
Nordic combined skiers at the 1972 Winter Olympics
Nordic combined skiers at the 1976 Winter Olympics
Nordic combined skiers at the 1980 Winter Olympics
Olympic Nordic combined skiers of West Germany
1953 births
Living people
Olympic medalists in Nordic combined
Medalists at the 1976 Winter Olympics
People from Schwarzwald-Baar-Kreis
Sportspeople from Freiburg (region)
Olympic cross-country skiers of West Germany